Stilbanthus is a monotypic genus of flowering plants belonging to the family Amaranthaceae. The only species is Stilbanthus scandens.

Its native range is Easatern Himalaya to Southern China and Myanmar.

References

Amaranthaceae
Amaranthaceae genera
Monotypic Caryophyllales genera